Charisella may refer to:
 Charisella, a genus of fishes in the family Melanotaeniidae, synonym of Melanotaenia
 Charisella, a genus of cnidarians in the family Condylanthidae, synonym of Cadetactis